Alberto Batistoni (born 7 December 1945 in San Giuliano Terme) is an Italian former footballer who played as a defender. He played 9 seasons (195 games, no goals) in Serie A for Hellas Verona, Roma and Cesena.

References

1945 births
Living people
Italian footballers
Association football defenders
Hellas Verona F.C. players
A.S. Roma players
A.C. Cesena players
Spezia Calcio players
Serie A players
Serie B players